Il barone di Trocchia was the first of fifty-one operas written by Italian composer Giuseppe Gazzaniga. The two-act intermezzo has an Italian libretto by Francesco Cerlone and premiered at the Teatro Nuovo in Naples, Italy during carnival 1768.

Roles

References

1768 operas
Italian-language operas
Operas by Giuseppe Gazzaniga
Intermezzi
Operas